Porechye is a rural locality (a village) in Andreyevskoye Rural Settlement, Alexandrovsky District, Vladimir Oblast, Russia. The population was 107 as of 2010.

Geography 
Porechye is located 28 km east of Alexandrov (the district's administrative centre) by road. Mezhakovo is the nearest rural locality.

References 

Rural localities in Alexandrovsky District, Vladimir Oblast